Water maze may refer to:

Neuroscience
 Water maze (neuroscience) instrument for testing memory in animals
 Cincinnati Water Maze
 Morris water maze a classic instrument for testing memory in animals